Breath: The New Science of a Lost Art is a 2020 popular science book by journalist James Nestor. The book provides a historical, scientific and personal examination of breathing, with a specific interest in contrasting the differences between mouth breathing and nasal breathing. The book became a bestseller, selling over a million copies.

Summary 
The book examines the history, science, and culture of breathing and its impacts on human health. It investigates the history of how humans shifted from the natural state of nasal breathing to chronic mouth breathing. Nestor explores research that argues that this shift (due to the increased consumption of processed foods) has led to a rise in snoring, sleep apnea, asthma, autoimmune disease, and allergies. It includes Nestor's first-person experiences with breathing. He also worked with scientists at Stanford University whose research suggests that returning to a state of nasal breathing will improve an individual's health. Nestor wrote the book after ten years of researching the subject.

Publication and promotion 
Breath was published by Riverhead Books on May 26, 2020. Nestor promoted the book with appearances on The Joe Rogan Experience and CBS This Morning.

The book debuted at number seven on The New York Times nonfiction best-seller list for the week ending May 30, 2020. The book has sold over a million copies.

Reception 
Breath received favorable reviews, with a cumulative "Positive" rating at the review aggregator website Book Marks. Kirkus Reviews called it a "welcome, invigorating user's manual for the respiratory system." Publishers Weekly called it a "fascinating treatise" on breathing. Stuart Miller of The Boston Globe wrote that Nestor succeeded at "explaining both the basics" and the "more complicated aspects of breathing properly." Writing for The Wall Street Journal, Sam Kean praised the book's "good foundation" but criticized Nestor for not exercising enough skepticism and investigating the placebo effect further. Kean also felt the book contained "dicey" evidence which reminded him of Linus Pauling's vitamin C advocacy. Kean expressed a "similar skepticism" about Nestor's claims regarding the benefits of ancient breathing exercises. In her review for the Evening Standard, Katie Law compared Breath to the "potentially life-changing books" including Matthew Walker's Why We Sleep, Shane O'Mara's In Praise of Walking, and Norman Doidge's The Brain's Way of Healing. Breath also received a favorable review by Library Journal.

The book was also perceived as being unexpectedly resonant due to its publication occurring amid the COVID-19 pandemic.

See also 
 George Catlin
 Nitric oxide
 Obligate nasal breathing

References

External links
Official Website
James Nestor Interview on Breath at The Joe Rogan Experience 
James Nestor Interview on Breath (beginning at 33:44) at The SETI Institute 
"The new science and the lost art of breathing" - KCRW, August 15, 2020.

2020 non-fiction books
American non-fiction books
Popular science books
Respiration
Riverhead Books books